Ghatkesar is a satellite town of Hyderabad in the Medchal-Malkajgiri district of Telangana, India. It is the Mandal headquarters of Ghatkesar Mandal in The Keesara revenue division. Located in the outer suburbs of Hyderabad, it is a part of The Hyderabad Metropolitan Development Authority.

Geography

Economy 
The presence of Warangal highway, Outer ring road and The Metro in Uppal have led to a large-scale boom in real-estate activity in and adjoining areas of Rampally, Narapally, Boduppal and Peerzadiguda. Ghatkesar also has Primary Health Care. Ghatkesar also has plenty of Electrical, Automobile, Electronics and Cloth Shops. Ghatkesar has a Bus Stop and a Railway Station with MMTS connectivity that provides Easy Connectivity between Ghatkesar and other places.

Educational Institutes
Ghatkesar has many Schools and Colleges. There are about 6 Engineering Colleges, 11 High Schools in the proximity of 10 Kilometers.

Engineering Colleges(<10 KM)

• Sreenidhi Institute of Technology and Science (SNIST), Yamnampet

• Anurag University, Venkatapur

• Anurag College of Engineering, Aushapur

• Princeton College of Engineering, Ankushapur

• Krishnamurthy Institute of Technology and Science, Edulabad

• Samskruthi College of Engineering, Ghatkesar

High Schools (<10 KM)

• Government High School

• Holy Faith Grammer High School

• St. Anthony's High School

• Ghatkesar Model High School

• Brilliant Grammer High School

• Rishi High School

• Vignan High School

• Rockwoods International School, Yamnampet

• Kendriya Vidyalaya, NFC Nagar

• Delhi Public School, Ghatkesar

• Rotterdam International School

Demographics
Ghatkesar has topped the 1st fastest growing Mandal in population growth of whole Telangana, with a decadal population growth record of 112%.

References

Villages in Medchal–Malkajgiri district